Kathy Bockus is a Canadian Progressive Conservative politician who has represented Saint Croix in the Legislative Assembly of New Brunswick since 2020.

References 

Living people
Progressive Conservative Party of New Brunswick MLAs
Women MLAs in New Brunswick
21st-century Canadian politicians
21st-century Canadian women politicians
Year of birth missing (living people)